
Gmina Wyszogród is an urban-rural gmina (administrative district) in Płock County, Masovian Voivodeship, in east-central Poland.

Villages
Apart from the town of Wyszogród, Gmina Wyszogród contains the villages and settlements of Bielice, Bolino, Chmielewo, Ciućkowo, Drwały, Gródkówko, Grodkowo, Kobylniki, Marcjanka, Pozarzyn, Pruszczyn, Rakowo, Rębowo, Rostkowice, Słomin, Starzyno, Wiązówka and Wilczkowo.

Neighbouring gminas
Gmina Wyszogród is bordered by the gminas of Brochów, Czerwińsk nad Wisłą, Iłów, Mała Wieś, Młodzieszyn and Naruszewo.

References
Polish official population figures 2006

Wyszogrod
Płock County